Friendly as a Hand Grenade is an album by the American band Tackhead. It was released in 1989 through TVT Records.

Production
The band added Bernard Fowler on vocals, and changed its name from Gary Clail's Tackhead Sound System. The album cover art is by Gee Vaucher.

Critical reception
The New York Times wrote that Tackhead "draw deep, swampy grooves from funk, rap, house music and dub reggae, then add a paranoid overlay."

Trouser Press wrote: "Opening and closing with the jaunty 'Ska Trek', living up to the title of 'Demolition House' and pursuing the by-now-familiar sardonic comments on the military with the infectious 'Airborne Ranger', the album captures Tackhead at its most coherent." The Spin Alternative Record Guide declared that "at its best, the group melded deeply psychedelic rock and funk in a way that the Red Hot Chili Peppers could only dream of."

Track listing

Personnel
Tackhead
Bernard Fowler – keyboards, vocals
Keith LeBlanc – drums, percussion, drum programming, sampler
Skip McDonald – engineering, guitar, keyboards, synthesizer, vocals
Doug Wimbish – bass guitar, guitar, keyboards, vocals
Additional musicians and production
Dave Pine – engineering
Adrian Sherwood – engineering, mixing
Tackhead – producer

Charts

Release history

References

External links 
 
 

1989 albums
TVT Records albums
Tackhead albums